China Securities may refer to:
 Securities industry in China
 China Securities Regulatory Commission, Chinese regulator
 China Securities Journal, a Chinese periodical
 China Securities Co., Ltd., now known as CSC Financial, Chinese company
 China Investment Securities, successor of China Southern Securities, Chinese company
 China Securities Index Co., Ltd., a Chinese company which provides stock market data
 CSI 300 Index